Saint-Jean-le-Blanc is the name of two communes in France:

 Saint-Jean-le-Blanc, Calvados, in the Calvados département
 Saint-Jean-le-Blanc, Loiret, in the Loiret département